Pfäfers is a municipality in the Wahlkreis (constituency) of Sarganserland in the canton of St. Gallen in Switzerland. The villages Pfäfers, St. Margrethenberg, Vadura, Valens, Vasön and Vättis belong to the municipality.

History
The Taminatal can look back on a long history of settlement. In the Drachenloch above Vättis stonetools of cavemen and bones of bears, perhaps 50,000 years old, were found. Examples from the find are on display in the local museum in Vättis.

Pfäfers reached importance through the foundation of the Benedictine monastery, Pfäfers Abbey, in the first half of the 8th century. It existed for over a thousand years and was closed in 1838. Since 1847 the abbey premises have been used as a mental institution.

Pfäfers is first mentioned in 762 as abbas de Fabarias.  In 1247 it was mentioned as Pheuers and in 1288 as Pfaevaers.  In Romansh it is known as Faveras.

In the 14th century Walser settled in the Calfeisental. Until today the colony of St. Martin and the Walserhouse on the alp Ebni can be visited.

Around the year 1240 the thermal spring in the Taminaschlucht ("gorge of the Tamina") was discovered. The sick people who bathed in the curative water were let down the narrow gorge on ropes. In the year 1630 a bath-house was constructed at the mouth of the gorge. The road to Ragaz was built in 1840 and in the following years the cure business was increasingly relocated to there. Today, Bad Pfäfers ("Pfäfers Spa"), the oldest Baroque bath-house in Switzerland, houses a restaurant and a museum.

Two important milestones of the 20th century in economical aspects were the opening of the clinic Valens in 1970 and of the power plants Sarganserland in 1975. The clinic Valens is specialised in rheumatology, neurology and orthopaedy. The power plants Sarganserland run a pumped storage hydro power plant. The storage lake Gigerwald and the compensation reservoir Mapragg with the control centre in Mapragg belong to the power plant. Both companies are important employers for the population of the community.

Demographics
, about 10.7% of the population was made up of foreign nationals. Of the foreign population,, 37 are from Germany, 4 are from Italy, 106 are from ex-Yugoslavia, 17 are from Austria,  and 63 are from another country. Over the last 10 years the population has decreased at a rate of -6.7%. Most of the population speaks German (93.3%), with Serbo-Croatian being second most common ( 1.7%) and Portuguese being third ( 1.3%). Of the Swiss national languages, 1,636 speak German, 3 people speak French, 5 people speak Italian, and 8 people speak Romansh.

The age distribution, in Pfäfers is; 259 children or 14.8% of the population are between 0 and 9 years old and 269 teenagers or 15.3% are between 10 and 19.  Of the adult population, 181 people or 10.3% of the population are between 20 and 29 years old.  277 people or 15.8% are between 30 and 39, 255 people or 14.5% are between 40 and 49, and 185 people or 10.5% are between 50 and 59.  The senior population distribution is 154 people or 8.8% of the population are between 60 and 69 years old, 116 people or 6.6% are between 70 and 79, there are 51 people or 2.9% who are between 80 and 89, and there are 7 people or 0.4% who are between 90 and 99.

 there were 197 persons (or 11.2% of the population) who were living alone in a private dwelling.  There were 303 (or 17.3%) persons who were part of a couple (married or otherwise committed) without children, and 1,026 (or 58.5%) who were part of a couple with children.  There were 82 (or 4.7%) people who lived in single parent home, while there are 5 persons who were adult children living with one or both parents, 14 persons who lived in a household made up of relatives, 2 who lived household made up of unrelated persons, and 125 who are either institutionalized or live in another type of collective housing.

In the 2007 federal election the most popular party was the SVP which received 41.6% of the vote.  The next three most popular parties were the CVP (24.6%), the SP (14.9%) and the FDP (10.6%).

The historical population is given in the following table:

Education
In the municipality of Pfäfers there are three kindergartens, three primary schools and a high school. One kindergarten and one primary school each are located in Pfäfers, Vättis and Valens. The highschool in Pfäfers is visited from children of the whole municipality.

In Pfäfers about 68% of the population (between age 25-64) have completed either non-mandatory upper secondary education or additional higher education (either university or a Fachhochschule).  Out of the total population in Pfäfers, the highest education level completed by 352 people (20.1% of the population) was Primary, while 620 (35.3%) have completed their secondary education, 133 (7.6%) have attended a Tertiary school, and 82 (4.7%) are not in school.  The remainder did not answer this question.

Economy
, Pfäfers had an unemployment rate of 0.61%.  , there were 142 people employed in the primary economic sector and about 57 businesses involved in this sector.  86 people are employed in the secondary sector and there are 24 businesses in this sector.  843 people are employed in the tertiary sector, with 45 businesses in this sector.

 the average unemployment rate was 1.1%.  There were 129 businesses in the municipality of which 26 were involved in the secondary sector of the economy while 47 were involved in the third.

 there were 513 residents who worked in the municipality, while 311 residents worked outside Pfäfers and 420 people commuted into the municipality for work.

Religion
Of the rest of the population, there are 6 individuals (or about 0.34% of the population) who belong to the Christian Catholic faith, there are 30 individuals (or about 1.71% of the population) who belong to the Orthodox Church, and there are 3 individuals (or about 0.17% of the population) who belong to another Christian church. There are 60 (or about 3.42% of the population) who are Islamic. There are 10 individuals (or about 0.57% of the population) who belong to another church (not listed on the census), 67 (or about 3.82% of the population) belong to no church, are agnostic or atheist, and 61 individuals (or about 3.48% of the population) did not answer the question.

Coat of arms
The blazon of the municipal coat of arms is Gules a Dove volant Argent membered of the first having a sprig in the mouth.

According to a legend, Pirmin wanted to build a friary in the region of Landquart. While the workers cut down trees, one of them accidentally injured his leg. When the monks cared for the injured man, a snowwhite dove appeared. It took a blood sprinkled splint and flew away. The monks followed the dove and found it in the Taminatal where it had alighted on a tree. Saint Pirmin took this as a sign from God and decided to build the friary on this place where it is now located

This anecdote is illustrated on the ceiling paintings of the church in Pfäfers.

Leisure

Summer

The landmark of Pfäfers is the baroque minster at the entrance of the village. 

The southernmost village in the canton of St. Gallen is Vättis.

Winter
Cross-country skiing is possible in St. Margrethenberg as well as in Vättis.

Traffic
Pfäfers and Valens are independently from each other connected with Bad Ragaz. The excellent road network is crucial for this spacious valley. The bus system connects every village with Bad Ragaz with its access to the railway system. The Taminabridge over the Taminaschlucht connects Pfäfers and Valens since 2017.

Wartensteinbahn was funicular between Bad Ragaz and Wartenstein (1892-1964).

Geography

Of this area, 29.4% is used for agricultural purposes, while 30.6% is forested. Of the rest of the land, 1.1% is settled (buildings or roads) and the remainder (38.9%) is non-productive (rivers or lakes).

The municipality is located in the Sarganserland Wahlkreis.  It stretches from the Taminatal south to the Kunkelspass and to the west into the high Calfeisen valley.  The municipality has some of the largest elevation differences of any municipality (Tamina canyon , Ringelspitz ).  It consists of the village of Pfäfers at the mouth of the Tamina Valley on a plateau above the Rhine river, the villages of Valens, Vasön and Vättis as well as the hamlets of St. Margrethenberg and Vadura.

Localities

Pfäfers
The fraction Pfäfers contains the village Pfäfers itself and the hamlets St. Margrethenberg and Vadura. It counts about 600 inhabitants.

The most important employer with a total of 245 employees is the clinic St. Pirminsberg with its fields psychiatry, psychotherapy and addiction treatment. Mentally ill people from the south part of the  Canton of St. Gallen and from Liechtenstein were treated there. Further employments are provided from agriculture and forestry as well as the small trade.

The control centre and the equalising reservoir Mapragg of the power plants Bad Sarganserland are located in Vadura. The pumped storage hydro power plant produces 444 million kWh of electricity on average per year.

Places of interest
 Ruin Wartenstein
 Old Bath Pfäfers with Paracelsus museum and bath museum
 Hot spring Bath Pfäfers
 Taminaschlucht (canyon)
 Natural Bridge
 former fort Furggels

Vättis

The most important branches of trade are agriculture and forestry as well as the industry of the second sector.

A place of interest is the Drachenloch museum. Finds from the prehistorical place of discovery are exposed there. In Gaspus is the lower station of the cable way to Vättnerberg situated. Numerous hiking tours to the superb world of the alps start in Vättnerberg.

Behind Vättis lies the Calfeisental which is as well a popular hiking area.

Places of interest
 Drachenloch - highest prehistorical place of discovery
 Drachenloch museum
 Walser colony St. Martin
 Walser house on the Alp Ebni
 Nature protection area Calfeisental and hunting ban area Graue Hörner
 Glarner Hauptüberschiebung (geological); Candidate of UNESCO-World natural heritage
 Silver mine Gnapperkopf

Valens
Valens ( above sea level) inklusive the hamlets Balen and Gassaura has circa 400 inhabitants. This village could be described as a sun terrace and has preserved its natural character.

The clinic Valens, which is specialised in rheumatology, neurology and orthopaedics, is the most important employer. The treatments are supported by therapies with the water of the hot spring. The bath is also accessible for the public.

Vasön
Vasön counts about 100 inhabitants and lies on 920 metres above sea level. Agriculture and forestry are really important in this small village. Several hiking tours start in Vasön.

Heritage sites of national significance
The Old Bath Pfäfers, the castle ruins of Wartenstein, the former Benedictine Abbey, and the paleolithic caves at Drachenloch in Vättis are all listed as Swiss heritage sites of national significance.

References

External links

Website of the Local Authority of Pfäfers
Website of the Fraction of Pfäfers
Website of the Fraction of Vättis
Website of the Clinic Valens
Website of the Clinic Pfäfers

Municipalities of the canton of St. Gallen
Cultural property of national significance in the canton of St. Gallen